Diamonds is a British television drama produced by ATV for the ITV in 1981.

Created by John Brason, the series was set amongst the exclusive world of diamond merchants, Coleman and Sons, in London and lasted for thirteen episodes.

Cast

 Frank Coleman – John Stride
 Margaret Coleman – Hildegard Neil
 Bernard de Haan – Simon Ward
 Dora Coleman – Doris Hare
 Barry Coleman – Ian McCulloch
 Joseph Coleman – Norman Wooland
 Catherine Coleman – Shirley Cain
 Terry Coleman – William Relton
 Elaine Coleman – Briony McRoberts
 David Kremer – Michael Culver
 Mordecai Kremer – John Barrard
 Jennifer Reece – Valerie Testa
 Tom Fabricius – Mark Kingston

Episodes

References

External links
 

1980s British drama television series
1981 British television series debuts
1981 British television series endings
1980s British television miniseries
Television shows produced by Associated Television (ATV)
Television shows set in London
English-language television shows
Television shows shot at ATV Elstree Studios